As U Were is the third solo studio album by Lyrics Born. It was released on Decon and Mobile Home Recordings in 2010. It peaked at number 89 on the Billboard Top R&B/Hip-Hop Albums chart.

Critical reception

At Metacritic, which assigns a weighted average score out of 100 to reviews from mainstream critics, the album received an average score of 63, based on 8 reviews, indicating "generally favorable reviews".

Track listing

Charts

References

External links
 

2010 albums
Lyrics Born albums
Decon albums
Albums produced by Jake One